Wilton is a small suburb in Wellington. It is best known for Otari-Wilton's Bush, a large reserve that is situated in the suburb. Otari-Wilton's bush is the only public botanic garden in New Zealand dedicated solely to native plants. It features 14 km of walking tracks and a 'canopy walkway'. The canopy walkway is a raised walkway that provides a unique chance to view life in, and from, the top level of trees such as mature tawa, rewarewa and hinau.

History 
Job Wilton was a sheep farmer; in 1861 he had a flock of 165 sheep, to be washed in the Kaiwharawhara Stream before shearing. He subdivided his farm in 1915, but Wilton was semi-rural to the 1930s with little housing development until after World War II. A Sunday trip to Wilton's Bush and Chapman's Gardens (now the Otari Plant Museum) required walking from the Wadestown tram terminus. From 1944 a feeder bus ran from the terminus. A school opened in 1956. Wilton House in Blackbridge Road was built for Courtenay Place chemist Mr O'Connor and his sister in 1925.

Demographics 

Wilton had a population of 2,205 at the 2018 New Zealand census, an increase of 156 people (7.6%) since the 2013 census, and an increase of 171 people (8.4%) since the 2006 census. There were 876 households. There were 1,059 males and 1,146 females, giving a sex ratio of 0.92 males per female. The median age was 38.5 years (compared with 37.4 years nationally), with 387 people (17.6%) aged under 15 years, 474 (21.5%) aged 15 to 29, 1,062 (48.2%) aged 30 to 64, and 282 (12.8%) aged 65 or older.

Ethnicities were 83.9% European/Pākehā, 9.8% Māori, 5.0% Pacific peoples, 9.3% Asian, and 3.8% other ethnicities (totals add to more than 100% since people could identify with multiple ethnicities).

The proportion of people born overseas was 27.3%, compared with 27.1% nationally.

Although some people objected to giving their religion, 56.6% had no religion, 31.0% were Christian, 0.7% were Hindu, 1.8% were Muslim, 1.0% were Buddhist and 3.1% had other religions.

Of those at least 15 years old, 957 (52.6%) people had a bachelor or higher degree, and 90 (5.0%) people had no formal qualifications. The median income was $46,600, compared with $31,800 nationally. The employment status of those at least 15 was that 1,041 (57.3%) people were employed full-time, 261 (14.4%) were part-time, and 72 (4.0%) were unemployed.

Education

School enrollment zone
Wilton is within the enrollment zones for Wellington College, Wellington Girls' College, Wellington High School, Onslow College, St Oran's College and the Otari School.

Primary schools
Otari School (Te Kura o Otari) is a state-funded full-primary school nestled next to the Otari-Wilton's Bush. The school encompasses three teaching styles. Montessori, Māori Immersion and the standard New Zealand curriculum.

Further reading

References

Suburbs of Wellington City